Engcobo Local Municipality is an administrative area in the Chris Hani District of the Eastern Cape in South Africa. Ngcobo is an isiXhosa name for a sweet grass found in the area.

Main places
The 2001 census divided the municipality into the following main places:

Politics 

The municipal council consists of thirty-nine members elected by mixed-member proportional representation. Twenty councillors are elected by first-past-the-post voting in twenty wards, while the remaining nineteen are chosen from party lists so that the total number of party representatives is proportional to the number of votes received. In the election of 1 November 2021, the African National Congress (ANC) won a majority of thirty-two seats on the council.
The following table shows the results of the election.

References

External links
 Official website

Local municipalities of the Chris Hani District Municipality